Władysław Musiał (22 March 1931 – 20 December 2010) was a Polish former footballer.

Musiał played for Lechia Gdańsk in the Polish Ekstraklasa.

In 1965 Musiał transferred to Australian club Cracovia where he played four seasons.

Musiał was recognised in the Football Hall of Fame Western Australia's team of the 1960s.

Musiał is commemorated by a star at the MOSiR Stadium in Gdańsk. The "Avenue of Stars" commemorates the efforts and success of former players and coaches.

References

Polish emigrants to Australia
Ekstraklasa players
Polish footballers
Gedania 1922 Gdańsk players
Zawisza Bydgoszcz players
Lechia Gdańsk players
2010 deaths
Place of birth missing
Association football midfielders
1931 births